Charlton Wong Chi Tang (born 1979) was a football referee in Hong Kong First Division League. He was selected as AFC Elite Fourth Official in 2008 AFC Elite Panel.

He is now the discipline master and a math teacher of STFA Seaward Woo College

Career

Hong Kong First Division League matches
 2007–08: 9 matches
 2008–09: 13 matches
 2009–10: 15 matches

References

 FIFA.com - Hong Kong: Referees (cached on 27 November 2010)

External links
 Wong Chi Tang Charlton's HomePage
 

Hong Kong football referees
1979 births
Living people